Adolfo Pichardo (born October 1939, Havana) is a Cuban pianist, conductor, arranger, and composer.

Pichardo studied piano at the Havana Municipal Conservatory, and in 1954 joined the band Conjunto Casino Juvenil as a pianist. He later came to direct the Orquesta Juvenil de Música Moderna.

The Cuban Orchestra of Modern Music was founded on April 23, 1967, and was one of the most famous of the time. Already in 1966, a group of young musicians had organized the Youth Orchestra of Modern Music, under the direction of pianist Adolfo Pichardo.

He also directed the orchestra of the famous cabaret " Tropicana" many years. Pichardo also joined the "Buena Vista Social Club in the 90's and he has been recognized as an outstanding arranger and composer. In the 60's he married the famous dancer of Tropicana Cabaret, Yolanda Leon Suarez. He has developed a well known career as musician, composer and arranger. He has been an important pillar of the Cuban culture. He has taken his beautiful music to many European countries and he has performed with many outstanding musicians of the world.

References

1939 births
Living people
Cuban pianists
Cuban conductors (music)
21st-century conductors (music)
21st-century pianists